The Cultural Zones of India are seven overlapping zones defined by the Ministry of Culture of the Government of India to promote and preserve the cultural heritage of various regions of India. Each of these zones has been provided with a zonal centre. Most zonal centres were announced by the then-Prime Minister of India, Rajiv Gandhi, in 1985 and formally began functioning in the 1986–87 period. Their stated goal is "to strengthen the ancient roots of Indian culture and evolve and enrich composite national culture".

The city of Kolkata, formerly the capital of British India and West Bengal, is also known as the "Cultural Capital of India."

The zones

Each zone has a zonal headquarters where a zonal cultural center has been established. Several states have membership in multiple zones, but no state subdivisions are utilized in the zonal divisions. In addition to promoting the culture of the zones they are responsible for, each zonal center also works to cross-promote and create exposure to other cultural zones of India by organizing functions and inviting artistes from other zones.

See also
 Zonal Councils of India
 Earthquake zones of India
 List of special economic zones in India
 List of ecoregions in India
 Administrative divisions of India

References

External links
 Cultural Center in India
 Official Website of North Zone Cultural Centre
 Official Website of North-East Zone Cultural Centre
 Official Website of South Zone Cultural Centre 
 Official Website of West Zone Cultural Centre
 Information about West Zone Cultural Centre and Shilpgram.

Cultural organisations based in India
Indian culture
Ministry of Culture (India)